K-Ci & JoJo is an American R&B duo, consisting of brothers Cedric "K-Ci" Hailey (born September 2, 1969) and Joel "JoJo" Hailey (born June 10, 1971). Natives of Monroe, North Carolina, they are also the lead singers of the chart-topping R&B group Jodeci with the DeGrate brothers—Donald (better known as DeVante Swing) and Mr. Dalvin.

History

Music beginnings 
K-Ci and JoJo first gained recognition as members of a family gospel quartet, Little Cedric and the Hailey Singers of North Carolina. The group released 3 albums on the AIR (Atlanta International Records) label: "I'm Alright Now" in 1983, "Jesus Saves" which hit number 4 on the Billboard Gospel chart in 1984 and "God's Blessings" which hit number 22 in 1985. They joined brothers Donald "DeVanté Swing" DeGrate and Dalvin "Mr. Dalvin" DeGrate to form the R&B group Jodeci. K-Ci & JoJo's first sign of independence came in 1994 when K-Ci covered Bobby Womack's hit "If You Think You're Lonely Now" for the movie Jason's Lyric. Early in 1996, K-Ci & JoJo teamed up for the song "How Could You" for the movie Bulletproof starring Damon Wayans and Adam Sandler. By July 1996, K-Ci & JoJo were featured guest artists in 2Pac's number-one R&B and Billboard Hot 100 hit "How Do U Want It".

1997–1998: Love Always 
The brothers made their side projects into a full album, Love Always. Released on June 17, 1997, the album spawned two top-ten R&B hits: "You Bring Me Up" (Pop #26) and "Last Night's Letter" (Pop #46). The minor success of those singles, however, paled in comparison to the success of the album's third single, "All My Life" (which was dedicated to JoJo's daughter). A supple, lush ballad far removed from the Jodeci material of the early 1990s, "All My Life" was the number-one song on the Hot 100 for three weeks, a feat that K-Ci & JoJo had never achieved with Jodeci. While future singles and albums would be crafted in the vein of "All My Life", it remains the duo's only number-one hit and by far the song they are most widely known for, even amongst non-fans due to its frequent use in film and television. Love Always went on to sell four million copies, and the success of the album put Jodeci's reunion on hold indefinitely. During the recording of Love Always they also appeared in the song "I Care 'Bout You" as a member of the R&B supergroup Milestone along with After 7 which appeared on the soundtrack for the movie, Soul Food that was written and produced by Babyface.

In 1998, K-Ci & JoJo recorded the song "Money Can't Buy You Love," which was produced for the film The Players Club.

In 1999, K-Ci & JoJo recorded "Life", which was written and produced by R. Kelly, for the soundtrack to the Eddie Murphy and Martin Lawrence movie Life.

1999: It's Real 
K-Ci & JoJo's second studio album, It's Real was released on June 22, 1999. It peaked at number eight on the Billboard 200, peaked at number two on the R&B/Hip Hop Albums, and was certified platinum by the RIAA. Outside of the US, the album reached top 20 on the Dutch Mega Album Top 100, the Canadian Albums Chart, and appeared on the New Zealand Top 40 Albums and the ARIA Charts. The album spawned four singles, including "Tell Me It's Real", which peaked at #2 on the Billboard Hot 100, and was a smash hit.

It's Real received a three star rating from AllMusic.

2000: X 
K-Ci & JoJo returned with X on December 5, 2000. X, the Roman numeral for ten, was picked as the album title to celebrate the Haileys' tenth anniversary in the music business. They made a strong return to the Billboard Hot 100 early in 2001 with the song "Crazy", also included on the Save the Last Dance soundtrack. "Crazy" peaked at number eleven on the Billboard Hot 100. The album also features a hidden Jodeci track entitled "Slip And Fall". Other tracks included "Honest Lover," "One Last Time," and "All the Things I Should Have Known"  which Vibe magazine considered "convey a similar mix of hip hop collective that launched Del the Funky Homosapien."

2002–2008: Emotional and other projects 
The fourth K-Ci & JoJo album, Emotional, was released on November 26, 2002, but did not find commercial success. The CD consisted of two singles, "This Very Moment." and the Rodney "Dark Child" Jerkins produced "It's Me".  The album contained their personal favorite "How Long" written by Steve Vaughn and Jojo Hailey.

In late 2006, K-Ci released his debut solo album entitled My Book. K-Ci & JoJo released a greatest hits album on February 8, 2005. On February 6, 2008, they released their fifth compilation album called Love, which was released only in Japan.

2013–present: My Brother's Keeper 
In 2010, they signed an exclusive deal with R&B crooner Kenneth "Babyface" Edmonds' upstart Soda Pop Records, distributed through E1 Music. On June 25, 2013, they released their new single, "Knock It Off" via iTunes through E1 Music. On September 30, 2013, My Brother's Keeper, was released.

Media 
In 2010, TV One aired the reality docu-series, K-Ci & JoJo... Come Clean, which featured Cedric "K-Ci" and Joel "JoJo" Hailey, lead singers of Jodeci. The series showcased the brothers current struggles with alcohol, as they work to rebuild their relationship and make a comeback. K-Ci & JoJo... Come Clean,  was produced by John Doe Media, with Carl Craig and D. Renard Young serving as executive producers. The series only aired for one season, but still runs several times a year.

Legal issues 
In 2001, K-Ci pleaded no contest to four charges of lewd conduct. He had been charged with 24 counts of lewd conduct and indecent exposure following an incident during the December 16, 2000, Jingle Ball concert at L.A.'s Shrine Auditorium during which the singer exposed his genitals twice to the crowd while performing.

Discography 

 Love Always (1997)
 It's Real (1999)
 X (2000)
 Emotional (2002)
 My Brother's Keeper (2013)

Awards and nominations

American Music Awards 

|-
| 1999 || K-Ci & JoJo || Favorite R&B Band/Duo/Group || 
|-
| 2000 || K-Ci & JoJo || Favorite R&B Band/Duo/Group ||

Blockbuster Awards 

|-
| 1999 || K-Ci & JoJo || Best Group – R&B ||

Grammy Awards 

|-
| 1997 || "How Do U Want It" || Best Rap Performance by a Duo or Group || 
|-
| 1999 || "All My Life" || Best R&B Performance by a Duo or Group with Vocals || 
|-
| 1999 || "All My Life" || Best R&B Song ||

MTV Video Music Awards 

|-
| 1998 || "All My Life" || Best R&B Video || 
|-
| 2001 || "Crazy" || Best Video from a Film ||

NAACP Awards 

|-
| 1999 || K-Ci & JoJo || Outstanding Duo or Group ||

Soul Train Awards 

|-
| 1999 || "All My Life" || Best R&B/Soul Single, Group, Band or Duo ||

References

External links 
Official Site
RockOnTheNet – Jodeci
K-Ci & Jojo on Soulrnb.com French group

American soul musical groups
African-American musical groups
Family musical groups
Musical groups from North Carolina
Sibling musical duos
Contemporary R&B duos
American hip hop singers
MCA Records artists
EMI Records artists
MNRK Music Group artists
American musical duos